Lang's red colobus (Piliocolobus langi) is a species of red colobus monkey. Historically it had been treated as a subspecies of the Central African red colobus, (P. foai) but more recent taxonomies generally treat it as a separate species.

Lang's red colobus lives in lowland rainforest in the northeastern portion of the Democratic Republic of the Congo between the Lualaba River and the Aruwimi-Ituri River. It eats leaves, fruit, flowers, buds and possibly seeds.

References

Lang's red colobus
Mammals of the Democratic Republic of the Congo
Endemic fauna of the Democratic Republic of the Congo
Lang's red colobus
Taxa named by Joel Asaph Allen